Grete Kummen (born 21 April 1952) is a Norwegian cross-country skier, born in Sigdal. She represented the club IL Heming. She competed in 5 km, 10 km and the relay at the 1976 Winter Olympics in Innsbruck. She was Norwegian champion in 10 km in 1976.

Cross-country skiing results

Olympic Games

References

External links

1952 births
Living people
People from Sigdal
Norwegian female cross-country skiers
Olympic cross-country skiers of Norway
Cross-country skiers at the 1976 Winter Olympics
Sportspeople from Viken (county)